Arcadio is a given name. Notable people with the name include:

José Arcadio Buendía, fictional patriarch in the novel One Hundred Years of Solitude by Colombian author Gabriel García Márquez
Arcadio Arellano (1872–1920), notable architect who was considered a pioneer during his time
Arcadio González, former football player from Paraguay
Arcadio Huang (born 1679), Chinese Christian convert, brought to Paris by the Missions étrangères
José Arcadio Limón (1908–1972), dancer and choreographer who developed what is now known as 'Limón technique'
Arcadio López (born 1910), Argentinian football defender
Arcadio Maxilom (1862–1924), Filipino teacher and hero of the Philippine Revolution
Félix Arcadio Montero Monge (1850–1897), lawyer, a politician, and a union leader in Costa Rica
Arcadio Padilla (born 1941), Mexican rower
Arcadio Poveda (born 1930), Mexican astronomer who developed a method to calculate the mass of elliptical galaxies
Arcadio Larraona Saralegui, CMF (1887–1973), Spanish Cardinal of the Catholic Church
Arcadio Venturi (born 1929), retired Italian professional footballer

See also
Dr. Arcadio Santos Avenue, the primary east–west thoroughfare in Parañaque, southern Metro Manila, Philippines
Arcade (disambiguation)
Arcadia (disambiguation)
Arcado (disambiguation)

Spanish masculine given names